Bogdan Florin Miron (born 17 March 1990) is a Romanian professional footballer who plays as a goalkeeper for SCM Zalău.

References

External links
 
 

1990 births
Living people
Sportspeople from Satu Mare
Romanian footballers
Association football goalkeepers
Liga I players
Liga II players
FC Olimpia Satu Mare players
CS Luceafărul Oradea players
CS Național Sebiș players
FC UTA Arad players
Sepsi OSK Sfântu Gheorghe players
ACS Viitorul Târgu Jiu players
Cigánd SE players
Romanian expatriate footballers
Romanian expatriate sportspeople in Portugal
Expatriate footballers in Portugal
Romanian expatriate sportspeople in Hungary
Expatriate footballers in Hungary